Keezhapavur is a town panchayat, in Tenkasi district in the Indian state of Tamil Nadu.

Demographics
 India census, Keezhapavur had a population of 19,958. Males constitute 50% of the population and females 50%. Keezhapavur has an average literacy rate of 67%, higher than the national average of 59.5%: male literacy is 76%, and female literacy is 57%. In Keezhapavur, 12% of the population is under 6 years of age.

References

Cities and towns in Tirunelveli district